Duanqiao may refer to:

Duanqiao, Guizhou, a town in Guanling Buyei and Miao Autonomous County, Guizhou, China
Duanqiao gas field, a natural gas field in Xihu Trough below the East China Sea
Broken Bridge, a traditional Chinese opera based on the Legend of the White Snake, related to the West Lake bridge

Tourist attractions
Yalu River Broken Bridge, a half-destroyed bridge over the Yalu River in Dandong, Liaoning, China
Longteng Bridge or Longteng Broken Bridge, a damaged bridge in Sanyi Township, Miaoli County, Taiwan
 Broken Bridge of the West Lake, Hangzhou, Zhejiang, China

See also
Broken bridge (disambiguation)